The Return of the Chlorophyll Bunny is the fourth mini-album by Olivia Lufkin, released on December 3, 2003 under the labels Avex Trax and Tower Records Japan.

Track listing
 "Dreamcamp"
 "Skip to a Little 'Number'"
 "Purple Box"
 "Under Your Waves"
 "Space Halo"

References

Olivia Lufkin albums
2003 EPs
Avex Group EPs